"Fade to Black" is a song and the first power ballad by American heavy metal band Metallica, released as the first promotional single from its second studio album, Ride the Lightning. The song was ranked as having the 24th best guitar solo ever by Guitar World readers.

The song peaked at number 100 on Swiss Singles Chart in 2008. The song is certified gold by the Recording Industry Association of America.

Background
In an interview on the set of the production MTV Icon: Metallica in 2003, drummer Lars Ulrich recalls how he and vocalist/rhythm guitarist James Hetfield were "obsessed with death" at the time the album and song were produced. Hetfield later admitted that a break-in to their gear truck resulting in the loss of his favorite Marshall amplifier also contributed to the mood of the song.

The song's lyrics address suicidal feelings. It begins with an acoustic guitar introduction and becomes progressively heavier as the song goes on, similar to their future songs, "Welcome Home (Sanitarium)", "One", and "The Day That Never Comes". James Hetfield commented on the song in a 1991 interview with Guitar World:

A review by Gina Boldman described "Fade to Black" as "one of the few Metallica tracks to get radio airplay in the mid- to late '80s."

Since its release, "Fade to Black" has been a fixture in Metallica's live performances. It was also the last song that Metallica performed live with former bassist Jason Newsted before he left the band, of which occurred at the VH1 Music Awards on November 30, 2000. It was one of his favorite Metallica songs, and was said to be of great sentimental value to him, although it had been written before he had joined the band. His previous band, Flotsam and Jetsam, performed a song called "Fade to Black" on their 1986 album Doomsday for the Deceiver before he left to join Metallica.

While on the Guns N' Roses/Metallica Stadium Tour on August 8, 1992, Hetfield accidentally stepped into the path of one of the chemical flames that had been rigged to shoot from the lip of the stage while playing "Fade to Black". Hetfield's guitar protected him from the full force of the blast; however, the fire engulfed most of his left side, burning his hand, both arms, eyebrows, face and hair. He suffered second and third-degree burns, but was back on stage 17 days later, although his guitar duties were delegated to former guitar tech and Metal Church guitarist John Marshall for four weeks while he made a full recovery.

"Fade to Black" was the last song to be played on the Los Angeles heavy metal radio station KNAC, which went off the air on February 15, 1995. It would later sign off fellow longtime rock stations 94 WYSP in Philadelphia on September 2, 2011, and Power 97 in Winnipeg on January 29, 2015.

Track listing

Personnel
 James Hetfield – vocals, rhythm guitar, acoustic guitar
 Lars Ulrich – drums
 Kirk Hammett – lead guitar
 Cliff Burton – bass

References

External links

1980s ballads
1984 singles
1984 songs
Elektra Records singles
Heavy metal ballads
Megaforce Records singles
Metallica songs
Songs about death
Songs about suicide
Songs written by Cliff Burton
Songs written by James Hetfield
Songs written by Kirk Hammett
Songs written by Lars Ulrich